The 2009–10 Iowa State Cyclones women's basketball team represented the Iowa State University in the 2009–10 NCAA Division I women's basketball season. The Cyclones were coached by Bill Fennelly and played their home games at the Hilton Coliseum in Ames, Iowa. The Lady Clones finished second the Big 12 Conference and earned a #4 seed and a fourth consecutive trip to the NCAA women's tournament.  Hilton Magic propelled the team through the first and second rounds with attendance at Hilton Coliseum ranked 2nd in the nation.  However, UConn, the 2010 Champions, stopped the Lady Cyclones in the Sweet Sixteen.

Offseason
 Six Iowa State women’s basketball players have graduated from the university. The players include Shellie Mosman, Jocelyn Anderson, Amanda Nisleit, Heather Ezell, Nicky Wieben, and Toccara Ross. All five senior who finished their eligibility this season in the NCAA Elite have finished their academic endeavors, and junior Shellie Mosman will graduate with a degree in accounting in just three years. The 2008–09 senior class earned three NCAA championship berths, and appeared in the Elite Eight at the 2009 NCAA Division I women's basketball tournament. The senior class won 92 games in their careers and matched the school record for most wins in a season with 27 victories.

 Chassidy Cole, a 5-8 guard from Amarillo, Texas, has signed a national letter of intent to play basketball at Iowa State in 2009–10, Bill Cole will be a sophomore for the Cyclones after spending one year at Howard College in Big Spring, Texas. Cole led Howard to a 26–9 record in 2008–09 and a top-four finish in the Western Junior College Athletic Conference, averaging eight points, 4.1 rebounds, 3.2 assists and 2.5 steals per game as a freshman. Howard was the National Junior College Athletic Association Region 5 champion and qualified for the national tournament. Cole led her region in assist-to-turnover ratio and ranked sixth in steals per game. She knocked down 33 three-pointers at a 32.4 percent clip, which ranked 14th regionally. Cole passed out five or more assists in seven contests and nabbed three or more steals 13 times.

 Other incoming players include Adrianna Prins, Amanda Zimmerman, Chelsea Poppens, and Jessica Schroll.  Prins is an ESPNU HoopGurlz top 100 player from Broomfield, Colorado. At 6 foot 6 inches, she will be one of the tallest post players in the Big 12 for 2009–2010 season.  Zimmerman is also a highly ranked recruit who committed to ISU while during her 8th grade year at Ballard-Huxley High School, Iowa.  Zimmerman will be playing as a power forward. Poppens is a power forward from Aplington-Parkersburg High School, Iowa.  Schroll is a shooting guard from H. H. Dow High School, Michigan.
July 7: Jessica Schroll tore anterior and medial cruciate ligaments in her left knee during prime recruiting time the summer before her junior season in high school. Schroll’s knee injuries sidelined her for her entire junior campaign, but she came back to average 14.7 points, three assists and 2.7 steals per game as a senior at H.H. Dow High School in Midland, Michigan. Schroll moved to campus and started summer school on June 15, and she has spent time both on and off the court with her new teammates preparing for the upcoming season.

Roster

Schedule

|-
!colspan=9| Pre-Season (Exhibition)

|-
!colspan=9| Regular season

|-
!colspan=9| Big 12 Tournament

|-
!colspan=9| NCAA Division I Tournament

Regular season

Player stats

Postseason

NCAA basketball tournament

Awards and honors

Team players drafted into the WNBA

References

Iowa State
Iowa State Cyclones women's basketball seasons
Iowa State
Iowa State Cyc
Iowa State Cyc